Space Metal is a double compilation album by UFO released on Nova Records in 1976. The double LP set combines tracks taken from their first three albums: UFO 1, Flying and their Japanese only release UFO Lands in Tokyo (The last title is given on the sleeve as UFO Live).

Track listing

Side 1
"Loving Cup" (Butterfield) – 5:10
"Shake It About" (Way/Mogg/Parker/Bolton) – 3:46
"Silver Bird" (Way/Mogg/Parker/Bolton) – 6:45
"(Come Away) Melinda" (Hellerman/Minkoff) – 4:49
"Evil" (Way) – 3:27

Side 2
"Flying" (Way/Mogg/Parker/Bolton) – 26:30

Side 3
"A Boogie for George" (Way/Mogg/Parker/Bolton) – 4:15
"Star Storm" (Way/Mogg/Parker/Bolton) – 18:50

Side 4
"Timothy" (Way/Mogg/Parker/Bolton) – 3:28
"C'mon Everybody" (Cochran/Capehart) – 3:10
"Follow You Home" (Way) – 6:00
"Prince Kajuku" (Way/Mogg/Parker/Bolton) – 3:55

References

1976 compilation albums
UFO (band) compilation albums
Nova albums